() is a municipality and village in Frýdek-Místek District in the Moravian-Silesian Region of the Czech Republic. It has about 300 inhabitants.

Polish minority makes up 20.1% of the population.

Etymology
The name is of topographic origins, meaning "large field" in Slavic languages (wiele pole in Polish, velké pole in Czech). It was first written as Wele Pole.

Geography
Vělopolí lies in the historical region of Cieszyn Silesia, in the Moravian-Silesian Foothills.

History

The first written mention of Vělopolí is from 1448. Politically it belonged then to the Duchy of Teschen. 

After Revolutions of 1848 in the Austrian Empire a modern municipal division was introduced in the re-established Austrian Silesia. The village as a municipality was subscribed to the political and legal district of Cieszyn. According to the censuses conducted in 1880–1910 the population of the municipality dropped from 327 in 1880 to 306 in 1910 with all the inhabitants being native Polish-speakers. In terms of religion in 1910 the majority were Protestants (88.2%), followed by Roman Catholics (11.8%).

After World War I, Polish–Czechoslovak War and the division of Cieszyn Silesia in 1920, Vělopolí became a part of Czechoslovakia. Following the Munich Agreement, in October 1938 together with the Zaolzie region it was annexed by Poland, administratively adjoined to Cieszyn County of Silesian Voivodeship. It was then annexed by Nazi Germany at the beginning of World War II. After the war it was restored to Czechoslovakia.

References

External links

 

Villages in Frýdek-Místek District
Cieszyn Silesia